Kubilay Karça (born 1996) is a Turkish rapper and songwriter. He began his career with a single named "Kumpas". He has collaborated on a lot of projects with Sansar Salvo, Şehinşah, Anıl Piyancı, Allâme and Feride Hilal Akın.

Discography

Albums 
Cehennem Ateşi (2019)
Mücevher (2019)
Gökten Düştüm (2020)

Singles 
"Kumpas"
"Kıskanç" (feat. Şehinşah)
"Daha Yeni Başladı" (feat. Berk Coşkun)
"Eyvallah" (feat. Abdurrahman Şimşek)
"Şeytan" (feat. Rona Say)
"Uzak"
"Bana Gel" (feat. Rona Say)
"Başımda Belalar" (feat. Tuğrul Bektaş)
"Duman"
"S.O.S" (feat. MobBeatz)
"Konuma Gerek Yok"
"Yarınım Yok" (feat. Allâme)

References 

1996 births
Living people
Turkish rappers
Turkish songwriters
21st-century Turkish male singers
21st-century Turkish singers
Turkish singer-songwriters
People from Eskişehir